The Celtic deities are known from a variety of sources such as written Celtic mythology, ancient places of worship, statues, engravings, religious objects, as well as place and personal names.

Celtic deities can belong to two categories: general and local. General deities were known by the Celts throughout large regions, and are the gods and goddesses called upon for protection, healing, luck, and honour. The local deities from Celtic nature worship were the spirits of a particular feature of the landscape, such as mountains, trees, or rivers, and thus were generally only known by the locals in the surrounding areas.

After Celtic lands became Christianised, there were attempts by Christian writers to euhemerize or even demonize most of the pre-Christian deities, while a few others became Saints in the church. The Tuatha Dé Danann of Irish mythology, who were commonly interpreted as divinities or deified ancestors, were downgraded in Christian writings to, at best "fallen angels", or mere mortals, or even portrayed as demons.

Ancient Gaulish and Brittonic deities
The Gauls inhabited the region corresponding to modern-day France, Belgium, Switzerland, southern and western Germany, Luxembourg and northern Italy. They spoke Gaulish. The Celtic Britons inhabited most of the island of Great Britain and spoke Common Brittonic or British.

Female
 Abnoba - Gaulish goddess worshipped in the Black Forest
 Acionna - Gallic goddess of the river Essonne
 Adsagsona - Gallic goddess of magic named on the Larzac tablet
 Adsullata - goddess of the River Sava
 Agronā - hypothetical Brittonic goddess of the River Ayr
 Alantedoba - a goddess in Val Camonica
 Ancamna - Gallic goddess in the Moselle Valley
 Ancasta - Brittonic goddess of Clausentum
 Andarta - Gallic goddess
 Andrasta - Brittonic goddess of victory
 Annea Clivana - Gallic goddess of the Cenomani
 Apadeva - a water goddess
 Arduinna - Gallic goddess of the Ardennes Forest
 Arnemetia - Brittonic goddess of nemetons
 Artio - Gallic goddess of the bear
 Axona - Gallic goddess of the river Aisne
 Belisama - Gallic and Brittonic goddess
 Bergusia - Gallic goddess of Alesia, companion of Ucuetis
 Bormana - Gallic goddess of mineral springs, companion of Bormanos
 Bricta (Brixta) - Gallic goddess of Luxeuil mineral springs, companion of Luxovios
 Brigantia - Brittonic goddess of the Brigantes
 Carpundia - a river goddess
 Carvonia - a goddess in Noricum
 Cathubodua - Gallic war goddess
 Caticatona - a Gallic water goddess in Rauranum
 Cissonia - a Gallic goddess of trade, companion of Cissonius
 Clota - hypothetical Brittonic goddess of the River Clyde
 Coventina - Brittonic goddess of wells and springs
 Damona - Gallic goddess of mineral springs, consort of Apollo Borvo and of Apollo Moritasgus
 Dea Latis - Brittonic goddess of bogs and pools, companion of Deus Latis
 Dea Matrona - "divine mother goddess" and goddess of the River Marne in Gaul
 Divona - Gallic goddess of sacred springs and rivers
 Epona - fertility goddess, protector of horses
 Erecura - chthonic goddess, companion of Dīs Pater
 Icauna - Gallic goddess of the river Yonne
 Icovellauna - Gallic goddess in the Moselle Valley
 Imona - a Gallic well goddess in Rauranum
 Inciona - a Gallic goddess of the Treveri
 Lerina - Gallic patron goddess of Lérins Islands, companion of Lero
 Litavis - a Gallic earth goddess
 Maiabus - a Gallic goddess in Metz
 Matronae Dervonnae - Gallic mother goddesses in Cisalpine GaulAnwyl 41.
 Matronae Vediantiae (Deae Vediantiae) - Gallic mother goddesses in Alpes Maritimae
 Maximia - fountain goddess in Amélie-les-Bains
 Nehalennia - a sea goddess in Zealand
 Nantosuelta - Gallic goddess, companion of Sucellos
 Ricagambeda - Brittonic goddess
 Ritona (Pritona) - Gallic goddess of the Treveri
 Rosmerta - Gallic goddess of fertility and abundance
 Sabrina - Brittonic goddess of the River Severn
 Seixomniai Leuciticai - a Celtic goddess, equated with Diana
 Senuna - a Brittonic goddess
 Sequana - Gallic goddess of the River Seine
 Sirona - Gallic goddess of healing
 Suleviae - a triune mother goddess
 Sulis - Brittonic goddess of the healing spring at Aquae Sulis (Bath)
 Tamesis - Brittonic goddess of the River Thames
 Veica Noriceia - a goddess attested in Noricum
 Verbeia - Brittonic goddess of the River Wharfe
 Vesunna - Gallic goddess of the Petrocorii
 Vibēs - a goddess in Noricum

Male
Abandinus - a Brittonic god of Durovigutum
 Alaunus (Alaunos) - a Gallic god of healing and prophecy
 Alisanos - a Gallic god
 Alus - an agricultural god of Cisalpine Gaul
 Ambisagrus - a god in Aquileia
 Arubianus - a god in Noricum
 Atepomarus - a Gallic horse god
 Bedaius - a lake god in Noricum
 Belatucadros (Bitucadros) - a Brittonic god
 Belenus (Belenos) - a god of healing
 Bergimus - a mountain god of Cisalpine Gaul
 Borvo (Bormanos) - god of healing springs
 Brasennus - a god known from a lone inscription in Cisalpine Gaul
 Caletos
 Caturix - war god of the Helvetii
 Cernunnos (Carnonos) - an antlered god
 Cissonius - a Gallic god of trade
 Mars Cnabetius - a Gallic god of war
 Condatis - a Gallic and Brittonic god of the confluences of rivers
 Cunomaglus - a Brittonic hunter god
 Cuslanus - a god in Cisalpine Gaul associated with Jupiter
 Deus Latis - a Brittonic god
 Deus Ducavavius - a god known from a lone inscription in Cisalpine Gaul
 Deus Orevaius - a god known from a lone inscription at Cemenelum
 Dorminus - god of the hot springs at Aquae Statiellae
 Intarabus - a Gallic god of the Treveri
 Esus - a Gallic god
 Glanis - Gallic god of Glanum
 Gobannus (Gobannos) - a Gallic and Brittonic smith god
 Grannus - a healing god
 Ialonus Contrebis - a Brittonic and Gallic god
 Latobius - a god in Noricum
 Lero - Gallic patron god of Lérins Islands
 Loucetios - a Gallic god of thunder
 Maponos - a Brittonic and Gallic god of youth
 Matunos - a Brittonic and Gallic bear god
 Moccus - a Gallic god of boars and pigs
 Moritasgus - Gallic healing god of Alesia
 Mullo - a Gallic god in Armorica
 Nemausus - Gallic god of Nîmes
 Niskus - a Brittonic river god
 Nodens (Nodons) - a Brittonic god of healing, dogs and hunting
 Ogmios - a Gallic god of eloquence
 Paronnus - a god known from a lone inscription at Brixia
 Rudiobus - a Gallic god in Loiret
 Smertrios - a Gallic god
 Souolibrogenos - a Galatian god
 Sucellus (Sucellos) - a Gallic and Brittonic god of agriculture and wine
 Tavianos - a Galatian god
 Taranis (Tanaros) - a god of thunder
 Toutatis - a tribal protector god
 Telesphorus - a Galatian god
 Tridamos - a Brittonic god
 Ucuetis - Gallic blacksmith god of Alesia
 Vellaunus - a Brittonic and Gallic god
 Vernostonos - a Brittonic god
 Vindonnus - an epithet for Belenus
 Vinotonus - a Brittonic god of Lavatrae
 Viridios - a Brittonic god of Ancaster
 Virotutis - a Gallic epithet of Apollo
 Visucius - a Gallo-Roman god of trade
 Vosegus - Gallic god of the Vosges Mountains

Iberian Celtic deities
The Celtiberians and Gallaecians were ancient Celtic peoples in Iberia. They spoke Hispano-Celtic languages.

Female
 Asidiae
 Ataegina (Ataecina)
 Besenclā (Besenclae) - a community and house protector
 Broeneiae
 Coruae
 Cosuneae
 Crougeae (Corougiae)
 Deae sanctae (Burrulobrigensi)
 Deiba
 Epane (Epona, Iccona)
 Erbina - a goddess of wild animals, hunting, and domestic security
 Ermae
 Flauiae Conimbriga (Flauiae Conimbrigae)
 Ilurbeda
 Lacipaea (Lacibiā, Lacibea)
 Laneana (Laneanis) - a goddess of springs and floods
 Losa
 Luna Augusta
 Mirobleo
 Munidis
 Nabia (Navia) - versatile goddess
 Nymphis
 Ocrimirae
 Reva (Reua) - personification of water flows
 Toga
 Trebaruna
 Trebopala
 Tutelae

Male
 AernusArenas-Esteban 110.
 Aetio
 Araco
 Ares Lusitani
 Bandua
 Bormanicus (Bormo, Borvo)
 Cariocecus
 Carneo
 Cohue
 Cosus (Cossue, Coso)
 Crouga
 Duberdicus
 Deo Nemedeco
 Deo Paramaeco
 Endovelicus
 Erriapus
 Issibaeo
 Kuanikio (Quangeio, Quangeius)
 Lugus
 Mermandiceo
 Picio
 Reo
 Salama
 Sucellus
 Tabaliaenus
 Tabudico
 Tongoenabiagus
 Turiacus
 Vorteaeceo
 Visucius

Gaelic deities and characters

The Gaels inhabited Ireland and parts of western Scotland. They spoke Goidelic languages.

Female
 Achtland
 Aibell
 Aimend
 Aífe
 Áine
 Airmed - goddess of healing and herbalism
 Anu - probable goddess of the earth and fertility, called "mother of the Irish gods" in Cormac's Glossary
 Bec
 Bébinn (Béfind)
 Bé Chuille
 Bodhmall
 Boann - goddess of the River Boyne, called Bouvinda by Ptolemy
 Brigid (Brigit) - called a "goddess of poets" in Cormac's Glossary, with her sisters Brigid the healer and Brigid the smith
 Caillech (Beira, Biróg) - an ancestral creator and weather goddess
 Canola 
 Carman 
 Cethlenn - wife of Balor of the Fomorians
 Clídna
 Clothru
 Danand (Danu)
 Deirdre  - the foremost tragic heroine in Irish legend
 Ériu, Banba & Fódla - tutelary triumvirate of goddesses, sisters, eponymous for Ireland (mainly Ériu)
 Ernmas
 Étaín - the heroine of Tochmarc Étaíne
 Ethniu (Ethliu) - the daughter of the Fomorian leader Balor and the mother of Lugh
 Fand
 Finnabair
 Flidais
 Fuamnach
 Gráinne
 Grian
 Lí Ban
 Macha
 Medb (Medb Lethderg)
 Mongfind
 The Morrígan, Badb, Nemain - also known as "The Thee Morrígna"
 Mór Muman (Mugain)
 Niamh
 Sadhbh
 Tailtiu
 Tlachtga

Male
 Abarta
 Abcán
 Abhean
 Aed
 Aengus (Óengus, Macán)
 Ailill
 Aillen
 Aí
 Balor
 Bith
 Bodb Dearg
 Bres
 Builg - a god of the Fir Bholg
 Cermait
 Cian
 Cichol
 Conand
 Crom Cruach 
 The Dagda (Dáire)
 Dian Cecht - called a "god of health" in Cormac's Glossary
 Donn
 Ecne
 Elatha
 Goibniu, Credne & Luchta - called the "three gods of craft"
 Labraid
 Lén
 Lir
 Mac Cuill, Mac Cecht, Mac Gréine
 Manannán mac Lir
 Miach
 Midir
 Mug Ruith
 Néit - called a "god of war" in Cormac's Glossary
 Nuada (Nechtan, Elcmar)
 Ogma
 Tethra
 Tuirenn (Delbáeth)

Brythonic deities and characters
The Brythonic peoples, descendants of the Celtic Britons, inhabited western Britain (mainly Wales, Cumbria and Cornwall) and Brittany. They spoke the Brythonic languages.

Female
<div class="mw-collapsible" style="width:100%; overflow:auto;">
 Arianrhod
 Blodeuwedd
 Branwen
 Ceridwen
 Creiddylad
 Creirwy
 Dôn
 Gwenhwyfar
 Modron - possible derivation of Dea Matrona
 Nimue
 Olwen
 Rhiannon

Male
 Afallach
 Amaethon
 Arawn - king of the otherworld realm of Annwn
 Beli Mawr
 Bladud
 Bendigeidfran (Brân the Blessed)
 Culhwch
 Dylan ail Don
 Efnysien
 Euroswydd
 Gilfaethwy
 Gofannon (Govannon) - a smith god
 Gwern
 Gwydion
 Gwyddno Garanhir
 Gwyn ap Nudd
 Hafgan
 Lludd Llaw Eraint (Nudd)
 Llŷr
 Mabon
 Matholwch
 Manawydan
 Nisien (Nissien, Nissyen)
 Pryderi
 Pwyll
 Taliesin
 Ysbaddaden

References

Works cited

"Greek & Roman Mythology - Tools". http://www.classics.upenn.edu/myth/php/tools/dictionary.php?regexp=RHEA&method=standard.

 2
Celtic